Porte de Clichy is a station on Line 13 and Line 14 of the Paris Métro and RER C, as well as a stop on Île-de-France tramway Line 3b. Located in the 17th arrondissement, the Métro station is situated on the northwestern branch of Line 13, under the Avenue de Clichy. It serves the Tribunal de grande instance de Paris.

History
The station opened 20 January 1912 with the inauguration of the second branch of Line B of the Nord-Sud Company from La Fourche. On 27 March 1931, Line B became Line 13 of the Métro network. The station remained the line's terminus until 3 May 1980, when the extension to Gabriel Péri opened. As such, a loop track is provided at the northern end of the station for trains to terminate and return towards central Paris.

The RER station opened on 29 September 1991. The station is named after the Porte de Clichy, a gate in the nineteenth century Thiers wall of Paris, which led to Clichy. On 24 November 2018, the Île-de-France tramway Line 3b was extended to Porte d'Asnières via Porte de Clichy. Porte de Clichy Métro station has had the free-out-of station interchange to tramway Line 3b.

One of the variants of the route of the extension of the RER E to the west would also have served the station, but this route was excluded in February 2011 in favor of the route passing through Porte Maillot.

At the beginning of 2018, the sub-title Tribunal de Paris appeared on plan of the line as well as on the platforms, following the inauguration of the new Judicial City of Paris dating from February 2018.

In 2019, 4,495,978 travelers entered this station, which places it in the 97th position of metro stations for its use.

On 28 January 2021, the station platforms for Line 14 opened.

Passenger services

Access
The station has three entrances:
 Entrance 1 - located on Boulevard Berthier;
 Entrance 2 - leading to Boulevard Bessières; and
 Entrance 3 - near the intersection of Boulevard Bessières and Avenue de la Porte-de-Clichy.

Station layout

Platforms

Line 13
Porte de Clichy is a station of particular configuration. It is made up of two non-parallel half-stations, 75 m long, located on the old turning loop and each includes a side platform track under an elliptical vault.

It has retained its characteristic decoration of the original Nord-Sud line with advertising frames and surrounds of the station name in a ceramic green colour (colour used for terminals and transfer stations) as well as the station name incorporated in white earthenware on a very large blue background between the advertising frames, only on the walls on the platform side. The name of the station is also inscribed in Parisine font on enamel plates on the track side. There are no geometric designs on the vault and walls, nor written directions on the ceramic tunnel entrances, which are all covered with bevelled white earthenware tiles.

This style has been combined since the 1980s with an Andreu-Motte style layout with an orange lighting canopy per half-station, as well as a bench in flat orange tiling with Motte seats in the same color. The station, with Pasteur and Porte de Versailles on line 12, ia one of three in the network to combine Andreu-Motte decoration with traditional Nord-Sud style ceramics.

Line 14
The line 14 station runs parallel to Avenue de la Porte-de-Clichy, located under the ZAC Clichy-Batignolles buildings. The main entrance to the station is at the corner of Avenue de la Porte-de-Clichy and Boulevard Bessières. Two secondary entrance are located, one on the forecourt of the Cité judiciaire de Paris, at the corner of Avenue de la Porte-de-Clichy and Rue André-Suarès and the other at the corner of Boulevard Berthier and Avenue de la Porte-de-Clichy, to connect with the tram line T3b. Its realization is the work of the Eiffage TP/Razel-Bec.

The station is built on seven levels. It has a floor area of 8,954 m2, a length of 120.5 m and a width of 20.65 m. Its docks are located at a depth of 26 meters.

Other connections
The station connects with the RER C station, Pontoise branch. It is served by lines 28, 54, 74, 163 and 173 of the RATP Bus Network. The station is also served by tram line T3b (since 24 November 2018) and, at night, by lines N15 and N51 of the Noctilien bus network.

Nearby
 Cité judiciaire de Paris
 Ateliers Berthier
 Parc Martin-Luther-King
 Cimetière des Batignolles
 Lycée Honoré-de-Balzac
 Gymnase Léon-Biancotto
 École 42

Gallery

Métro

Tramway

RER

See also
List of stations of the Paris Métro
List of stations of the Paris RER

References

External links
 

Paris Métro stations in the 17th arrondissement of Paris
Railway stations in France opened in 1912
Railway stations in France opened in 1991
Réseau Express Régional stations
Railway stations in France opened in 2021